The Brahmo Balika Shikshalaya is a girls' school in Kolkata, West Bengal, India. It is guided by the principles of the Brahmo Samaj movement. It was established on 16 May 1890 by the Sadharan Brahmo Samaj on the 12th anniversary of its foundation.

History 
The 1st Managing Committee appointed by the Sadharan Brahmo Samaj consisted of the following members:- Babu Madhusudhan Sen, Dwarakanath Gongopadhaya, Babu Upendrakishore Ray Chowdhury, Babu Adinath Chatterjee, Babu Umesh Chandra Dutta-Secretary, Miss LabanyaPrabha Bose –Assistant Secretary, Pandit Sivanath Sastri, Dr. M.M.Bose and Babu Umapada Rai. A boarding establishment was added from 1 October of the same year.

It was the first Montessori School in West Bengal. It was the second school for girls in Calcutta. The first school for girls was founded by John Elliot Drinkwater Bethune. The first graduate Indian woman Kadambini Bose was a student of the school.

References

School website

Hinduism in Kolkata
Schools affiliated with the Brahmo Samaj
High schools and secondary schools in West Bengal
Girls' schools in Kolkata
Academic institutions associated with the Bengal Renaissance
Educational institutions established in 1890
1890 establishments in India